Śląsk Wrocław II is a Polish football team, which serves as the reserve side of Śląsk Wrocław. They compete in the II liga after having won promotion in 2020, the highest league a reserve team is allowed to play in.

They play their home games at the Stadion Oporowska.

Śląsk II made their central level Polish Cup debut in the 2021–22 season, ex officio as the II liga team last season.

Honours

League
II liga (third division)
8th place: 2020–21

III liga (fourth division)
Winners: 2019–20

IV liga (fifth division)
Winners: 2018–19

Polish Cup records

References

External links 
 Śląsk Wrocław II at 90minut.pl 

 
 
Football clubs in Wrocław
Reserve team football in Poland